Arthur Martin McGarry (1898–1960) was an English footballer who played at right-half for Port Vale, Reading, and Rochdale.

Career
McGarry most likely joined Port Vale in the autumn of 1918. He played numerous games for the club in the war leagues and non-leagues before Vale were elected into the English Football League in October 1919. He played 45 games in 1919–20, and was a member of the sides that enjoyed double cup glory in 1920, but lost his place through injury in August 1920. He was released from The Old Recreation Ground at the end of the 1920–21 season after being able to muster just three Second Division appearances, and moved on to Reading and then Rochdale.

Family
His brother, J. McGarry, was also a footballer; he played as a half-back for Goldenhill Wanderers. He also made one appearance for Port Vale, replacing Arthur as half-back on 23 November 1918 in a war league game; a 4–1 loss at Burnley.

Career statistics
Source:

References

1898 births
1960 deaths
Sportspeople from Burslem
English footballers
Association football midfielders
Port Vale F.C. players
Reading F.C. players
Rochdale A.F.C. players
English Football League players